Her Majesty the Queen is an object-sculpture made by Joan Miró in 1974 and now part of the permanent collection of the Joan Miró Foundation in Barcelona.

Background 
Her Majesty the Queen, with His Highness the Prince and His Majesty the King are part of a series of sculptures made in 1974 when Miró enjoyed a time of international recognition. During that year a major retrospective of his work was shown  at both the Grand Palais and the Museé d'Art Moderne, in Paris. In Pasis there were three works exhibited for the first time.

The exhibition Magnetic Fields  had been held two years before at the Guggenheim Museum in New York City and Miró bronzes at the Hayward Gallery in London. This was made at the same time as the construction of the Joan Miró Foundation in Barcelona, which opened to the public on 10 June 1975. The international artistic recognition contrasts with the difficult situation in Spain during the last years of the dictatorship. In February of the same year Miró had painted the triptych The hope of a condemned Man. This painting concerned the conviction of the activist Salvador Puig Antich, who was finally executed by garrotte on 2 March 1974. Juan Carlos de Borbón, then Prince of Spain and five years old had sworn allegiance to Francisco Franco as his future head of the state.

Miró had created artworks that were critical of the concept of authority, based on the fictional character Ubu Roi back in 1941 and in 1966. These works about bombastic celebrities contrasts with the humility of the materials that he used.

After Franco had died, Miró talked about the civic responsibility of the artist during his acceptance speech for an Honorary degree at the University of Barcelona in 1979:

.

2011 Exhibition
The exhibition L'escala de l'evasió that opened in October 2011 was supported by access to Wikipedia using QRpedia codes that allowed access to visitors in Catalan, English and several other languages.

References

Further reading 

 
 
 
 
 
 

Sculptures by Joan Miró
1974 sculptures
Found object
Culture in Barcelona